Bobsleigh at the 1988 Winter Olympics consisted of two events, at Canada Olympic Park.  The competition took place between February 20 and February 28, 1988.

The event included competitors from countries with little history of bobsleigh participation and/or little or no snow. These countries included Jamaica (whose involvement spurred the film Cool Runnings in 1993), Mexico, and New Zealand. An informal "Caribbean Cup" of such countries was won by New Zealand's Alexander Peterson and Peter Henry, who finished equal twentieth. In the two-man event, the best result from a completely snow-less country was twenty-ninth by Bart Carpentier Alting and Bart Dreschsel of the Netherlands Antilles. Alting also competed in luge, finishing thirty-sixth out of thirty-eight.

Medal summary

Medal table

Three countries won medals in Calgary, with the Soviet Union leading the medal table, winning two medals, one gold and one bronze. East Germany won the most medals, with three.

Events

Participating NOCs

Twenty-three nations participated in bobsleigh at the 1988 Games. With nine debutants, more than a third of these were competing in Olympic bobsleigh for the first time. The nations making debuts were Netherlands Antilles, Australia, Bulgaria, U.S. Virgin Islands, Jamaica, Mexico, Monaco, New Zealand and Portugal.

Ireland 

For the first time, a team from Ireland was also entered in the competition. However, just ten days before the opening ceremony took place, its entry was cancelled by the Olympic Council of Ireland, without explanation. An attempt to overturn the withdrawal in court was unsuccessful. The story is told in the 2020 documentary film Breaking Ice.

See also
Jamaican Bobsled Team

References

External links
Wallechinsky, David and Jaime Loucky (2009). "Bobsleigh". In The Complete Book of the Winter Olympics: 2010 Edition. London: Aurum Press Limited.

 
1988
1988 Winter Olympics events
1988 in bobsleigh